The 1993–94 Danish Cup was the 40th installment of the Danish Cup, the highest football competition in Denmark.

Final

References

1993-94
1993–94 domestic association football cups
Cup